Tianzhu Mountain or Mount Tianzhu is a mountain in Anhui, China. Tianzhu Mountain is also called Mount Wan, from which the provincial abbreviation for Anhui ("Wan") derives. Ancient names of the mountain include Mount Huo 霍山, Mount Heng 衡山 (not to be confused with Mount Heng in Hunan Province), and Taiyue 太岳.

The mountain is located in Qianshan County, Anqing City. Tianzhu Mountain has 45 peaks which are collectively 1000 meters above sea level. There are two paths to reach the top, either from the east or from the west; many will try the west path first because it is the easier one.

The mountain has natural landscapes such as spectacular peaks and rocks, secluded caves, and canyons.

One of the famous sites is the Mystery Valley. It is a maze-like valley formed by the rocks falling from the mountain. The valley has 53 caves, which form a very complicated maze.

Subsequently certified as a National Geopark, and then as a regional geopark (Asia Pacific Geopark Network), it was admitted as a UNESCO Global Geopark in 2011.

See also
 Sanzu Temple
 List of Ultras of Tibet, East Asia and neighbouring areas

References

External links

 Travel spots and tips in Anhui and other provinces
 A trip to the Mystery Valley
 "Tianzhu Shan" on Peakbagger

Tourist attractions in Anhui
Tianzhu
Tianzhu
Parks in Anhui
Major National Historical and Cultural Sites in Anhui